Thomas McKeen Chidsey (January 26, 1884April 19, 1958) was a Pennsylvania lawyer and judge.  He served a term as the state's Attorney General, and was an associate justice of the state's Supreme Court.

Life and career
Chidsey was born the son of Andrew Dwight and Emily McKeen Chidsey.  He was admitted to the bar in 1907.  In 1913, he married Ellen Lea, and they had two daughters.

He was District Attorney for Northampton County, 1920–23.  He was appointed Attorney General in 1947.  He was appointed in 1950 to fill a vacancy on the state's Supreme Court, and was then elected to a full 21-year term.  He died in 1958.

References

Further reading
 

1884 births
1958 deaths
Politicians from Easton, Pennsylvania
Lafayette College alumni
University of Pennsylvania Law School alumni
Pennsylvania Attorneys General
Pennsylvania Republicans
County district attorneys in Pennsylvania
20th-century American politicians